Biological neuron models, also known as a spiking neuron models,  are mathematical descriptions of the properties of certain cells in the nervous system that generate sharp electrical potentials across their cell membrane, roughly one millisecond in duration, called action potentials or spikes (Fig. 2).   Since spikes are transmitted along the axon and synapses from the sending neuron to many other neurons, spiking neurons are considered to be a major information processing unit of the nervous system. Spiking neuron models can be divided into different categories:  the most detailed mathematical models are biophysical neuron models (also called Hodgkin-Huxley models) that describe the membrane voltage as a function of the input current and the activation of ion channels. Mathematically simpler are integrate-and-fire models that describe the membrane voltage as a function of the input current and predict the spike times without a description of the biophysical processes that shape the time course of an action potential. Even more abstract models only predict output spikes (but not membrane voltage) as a function of the stimulation where the stimulation can occur through sensory input or pharmacologically. This article provides a short overview of different spiking neuron models and links, whenever possible to experimental phenomena. It includes deterministic and probabilistic models.

Introduction: Biological background, classification and aims of neuron models 
Non-spiking cells, spiking cells, and their measurement

Not all the cells of the nervous system produce the type of spike that define the scope of the spiking neuron models. For example, cochlear hair cells, retinal receptor cells, and retinal bipolar cells do not spike. Furthermore, many cells in the nervous system are not classified as neurons but instead are classified as glia.

Neuronal activity can be measured with different experimental techniques, such as the "Whole cell" measurement technique, which captures the spiking activity of a single neuron and produces full amplitude action potentials.

With extracellular measurement techniques an electrode (or array of several electrodes) is located in the extracellular space. Spikes, often from several spiking sources, depending on the size of the electrode and its proximity to the sources, can be identified with signal processing techniques. Extracellular measurement has several advantages: 1) Is easier to obtain experimentally; 2) Is robust and lasts for a longer time; 3) Can reflect the dominant effect, especially when conducted in an anatomical region with many similar cells.

Overview of neuron models

Neuron models can be divided into two categories according to the physical units of the interface of the model. Each category could be further divided according to the abstraction/detail level:

 Electrical input–output membrane voltage models – These models produce a prediction for membrane output voltage as a function of electrical stimulation given as current or voltage input. The various models in this category differ in the exact functional relationship between the input current and the output voltage and in the level of details. Some models in this category predict only the moment of occurrence of output spike (also known as "action potential"); other models are more detailed and account for sub-cellular processes. The models in this category can be either deterministic or probabilistic.
 Natural stimulus or pharmacological input neuron models – The models in this category connect between the input stimulus which can be either pharmacological or natural, to the probability of a spike event. The input stage of these models is not electrical, but rather has either pharmacological (chemical) concentration units, or physical units that characterize an external stimulus such as light, sound or other forms of physical pressure. Furthermore, the output stage represents the probability of a spike event and not an electrical voltage.

Although it is not unusual in science and engineering to have several descriptive models for different abstraction/detail levels, the number of different, sometimes contradicting, biological neuron models is exceptionally high. This situation is partly the result of the many different experimental settings, and the difficulty to separate the intrinsic properties of a single neuron from measurements effects and interactions of many cells (network effects). To accelerate the convergence to a unified theory, we list several models in each category, and where applicable, also references to supporting experiments.

Aims of neuron models

Ultimately, biological neuron models aim to explain the mechanisms underlying the operation of the nervous system. However several approaches can be distinguished from more realistic models (e.g., mechanistic models) to  more pragmatic models (e.g., phenomenological models). Modeling helps to analyze experimental data and address questions such as: How are the spikes of a neuron related to sensory stimulation or motor activity such as arm movements? What is the neural code used by the nervous system? Models are also important in the context of restoring lost brain functionality through neuroprosthetic devices.

Electrical input–output membrane voltage models  
The models in this category describe the relationship between neuronal membrane currents at the input stage, and membrane voltage at the output stage. This category includes (generalized) integrate-and-fire models and biophysical models inspired by the work of Hodgkin–Huxley in the early 1950s using an experimental setup that punctured the cell membrane and allowed to force a specific membrane voltage/current.

Most modern electrical neural interfaces apply extra-cellular electrical stimulation to avoid membrane puncturing which can lead to cell death and tissue damage. Hence, it is not clear to what extent the electrical neuron models hold for extra-cellular stimulation (see e.g.).

Hodgkin–Huxley 

The Hodgkin–Huxley model (H&H model)
is a model of the relationship between the flow of ionic currents across the neuronal cell membrane and the membrane voltage of the cell. It consists of a set of nonlinear differential equations describing the behaviour of ion channels that permeate the cell membrane of the squid giant axon. Hodgkin and Huxley were awarded the 1963 Nobel Prize in Physiology or Medicine for this work.

We note the voltage-current relationship, with multiple voltage-dependent currents charging the cell membrane of capacity 

The above equation is the time derivative of the law of capacitance,  where the change of the total charge must be explained as the sum over the currents. Each current is given by

This expansion is given by

and our fractions follow the first-order kinetics

The Hodgkin–Huxley model may be extended to include additional ionic currents. Typically, these include inward Ca2+ and Na+ input currents, as well as several varieties of K+ outward currents, including a "leak" current.

The end result can be at the small end 20 parameters which one must estimate or measure for an accurate model.  In a model of a complex systems of neurons, numerical integration of the equations are computationally expensive. Careful simplifications of the Hodgkin–Huxley model are therefore needed.

The model can be reduced to two dimensions thanks to the dynamic relations which can be established between the gating variables. it is also possible to extend it to take into account the evolution of the concentrations (considered fixed in the original model).

Perfect Integrate-and-fire 
One of the earliest models of a neuron is the perfect integrate-and-fire model (also called non-leaky integrate-and-fire),  first investigated in 1907 by Louis Lapicque. A neuron is represented by its membrane voltage  which evolves in time during stimulation with an input current  according

which is just the time derivative of the law of capacitance, . When an input current is applied, the membrane voltage increases with time until it reaches a constant threshold , at which point a delta function spike occurs and the voltage is reset to its resting potential, after which the model continues to run. The firing frequency of the model thus increases linearly without bound as input current increases.

The model can be made more accurate by introducing a refractory period  that limits the firing frequency of a neuron by preventing it from firing during that period. For constant input  the threshold voltage is reached after an integration time  after start from zero. The firing frequency is the inverse of the total inter-spike interval (including dead time). The firing frequency as a function of a constant input current is therefore

A shortcoming of this model is that it describes neither adaptation nor leakage.  If the model receives a below-threshold short current pulse at some time, it will retain that voltage boost forever - until another input later makes it fire. This characteristic is clearly not in line with observed neuronal behavior. The following extensions make the integrate-and-fire model more plausible from a biological point of view.

Leaky integrate-and-fire 
The leaky integrate-and-fire model which can be traced back to Louis Lapicque, contains, compared to the non-leaky integrate-and-fire model a "leak" term in the membrane potential equation,  reflecting the diffusion of ions through the membrane. The model equation looks like

(The non-leaky integrate-and-fire model is retrieved in the limit  to infinity, i.e. if the membrane is a perfect insulator). The model equation is valid for arbitrary time-dependent input until a threshold  is reached; thereafter the membrane potential is reset.

Assuming a reset to zero, the firing frequency thus looks like

which converges for large input currents to the previous leak-free model with refractory period. The model can also be used for  inhibitory neurons.

The biggest disadvantage of the Leaky integrate-and-fire neuron is that it does not contain neuronal adaptation so that it cannot describe an experimentally measured spike train in response to constant input current. This disadvantage is removed in generalized integrate-and-fire models that also contain one or several adaptation-variables  and are able to predict spike times of cortical neurons under current injection to a high degree of accuracy.

Adaptive integrate-and-fire 

Neuronal adaptation refers to the fact that even in the presence of a constant current injection into the soma, the intervals between output spikes increase. An adaptive integrate-and-fire neuron model combines the leaky integration of voltage  with one or several adaptation variables  (see Chapter 6.1. in the textbook Neuronal Dynamics)

 

 

The reset value is one of the important parameters of the model. The simplest model of adaptation has only a single adaptation variable  and the sum over k is removed.

Integrate-and-fire neurons with one or several adaptation variables can account for a variety of neuronal firing patterns in response to constant stimulation, including adaptation, bursting and initial bursting. Moreover, adaptive integrate-and-fire neurons with several adaptation variables are able to predict spike times of cortical neurons under time-dependent current injection into the soma.

Fractional-order leaky integrate-and-fire 
Recent advances in computational and theoretical fractional calculus lead to a new form of model, called Fractional-order leaky integrate-and-fire.  An advantage of this model is that it can capture adaptation effects with a single variable. The model has the following form 

Once the voltage hits the threshold it is reset. Fractional integration has been used to account for neuronal adaptation in experimental data.

'Exponential integrate-and-fire' and 'adaptive exponential integrate-and-fire' 

In the exponential integrate-and-fire model, spike generation is exponential, following the equation:

 

Once the membrane potential crosses , it diverges to infinity in finite time. In numerical simulation the  integration is stopped if the membrane potential hits an arbitrary threshold (much larger than ) at which the membrane potential is reset to a value  . The voltage reset value  is one of the important parameters of the model. Importantly, the right-hand side of the above equation contains a nonlinearity that can be directly extracted from experimental data. In this sense the exponential nonlinearity is strongly supported by experimental evidence.

In the adaptive exponential integrate-and-fire neuron  the above exponential nonlinearity of the voltage equation is combined with an adaptation variabe w

 

 

where  denotes the adaptation current with time scale . The adaptive exponential integrate-and-fire model inherits the experimentally derived voltage nonlinearity  of the exponential integrate-and-fire model. But going beyond this model, it can also account for a variety of neuronal firing patterns in response to constant stimulation, including adaptation, bursting and initial bursting. However, since the adaptation is in the form of a current, aberrant hyperpolarization may appear. This problem was solved by expressing it as a conductance.

Stochastic models of membrane voltage and spike timing 
The models in this category are generalized integrate-and-fire models that include a certain level of stochasticity. Cortical neurons in experiments are found to respond reliably to time-dependent input, albeit with a small degree of variations between one trial and the next if the same stimulus is repeated. Stochasticity in neurons has two important sources. First, even in a very controlled experiment where input current is injected directly into the soma, ion channels open and close stochastically and this channel noise leads to a small amount of variability in the exact value of the membrane potential and the exact timing of output spikes. Second, for a neuron embedded in a cortical network, it is hard to control the exact input because most inputs come from unobserved neurons somewhere else in the brain.

Stochasticity has been introduces into spiking neuron models in two fundamentally different forms: either (i) a noisy input current is added to the differential equation of the neuron model; or (ii) the process of spike generation is noisy. In both cases, the mathematical theory can be developed for continuous time, which is then, if desired for the use in computer simulations,  transformed into a discrete-time model.

The relation of noise in neuron models to variability of spike trains and neural codes is discussed in Neural Coding and in Chapter 7 of the textbook Neuronal Dynamics.

Noisy input model (diffusive noise)  
A neuron embedded in a network receives spike input from other neurons. Since the spike arrival times are not controlled by an experimentalist they can be considered as stochastic. Thus a (potentially nonlinear) integrate-and-fire model with nonlinearity f(v) receives two inputs: an input   controlled by the experimentalists and a noisy input current  that describes the uncontrolled background input.

 

Stein's model is the special case of a leaky integrate-and-fire neuron and a stationary white noise current  with mean zero and unit variance. In the subthreshold regime, these assumptions yield the equation of the Ornstein–Uhlenbeck process

 

However, in contrast to the standard Ornstein–Uhlenbeck process, the membrane voltage is reset whenever V hits the firing threshold . Calculating the interval distribution of the Ornstein–Uhlenbeck model for constant input with threshold leads to a first-passage time problem. Stein's neuron model and variants thereof have been used to fit interspike interval distributions of spike trains from real neurons under constant input current.

In the mathematical literature, the above equation of the  Ornstein–Uhlenbeck process is written in the form

 

where  is the amplitude of the noise input and dW are increments of a Wiener process. For discrete-time implementations with time step dt the voltage updates are

 

where y is drawn from a Gaussian distribution with zero mean unit variance. The voltage is reset when it hits the firing threshold .

The noisy input model can also be used in generalized integrate-and-fire models. For example, the exponential integrate-and-fire model with noisy input reads

 

This is important because the frequency-current relation (f-I-curve) is often used by experimentalists to characterize a neuron. It is also the transfer function in

The leaky integrate-and-fire with noisy input has been widely used in the analysis of networks of spiking neurons. Noisy input is also called 'diffusive noise' because it leads to a diffusion of the subthreshold membrane potential around the noise-free trajectory (Johannesma, The theory of spiking neurons with noisy input is reviewed in Chapter 8.2 of the textbook Neuronal Dynamics.

Noisy output model (escape noise) 
In deterministic integrate-and-fire models, a spike is generated if the membrane potential  hits the threshold . In noisy output models the strict threshold is replaced by a noisy one as follows. At each moment in time t, a spike is generated stochastically with instantaneous stochastic intensity or 'escape rate' 

 

that depends on the momentary difference between the membrane voltage  and the threshold . A common choice for the 'escape rate'   (that is consistent with biological data) is

 

For  the threshold becomes sharp and spike firing occurs deterministically at the moment when the membrane potential hits the threshold from below.

The escape rate process via a soft threshold is reviewed in Chapter 9 of the textbook Neuronal Dynamics.

For models in discrete time, a spike is generated with probability

 

that depends on the momentary difference between the membrane voltage  at time  and the threshold . The function F is often taken as a standard sigmoidal   with steepness parameter , similar to the update dynamics in artificial neural networks. But the functional form of F can also be derived from the stochastic intensity  in continuous time introduced above as  where  is the distance to threshold.

Integrate-and-fire models with output noise can be used to predict  the PSTH of real neurons under arbitrary time-dependent input. For non-adaptive integrate-and-fire neurons, the interval distribution under constant stimulation can be calculated from stationary renewal theory.

Spike response model (SRM) 

main article: Spike response model

The spike response model (SRM) is a general linear model for the subthreshold membrane voltage combined with a nonlinear output noise process for spike generation. The membrane voltage  at time t is

 

The contributions to the voltage caused by a spike at time  are described by the refractory kernel . In particular,  describes the reset  after the spike and the time course of the spike-afterpotential following a spike. It therefore expresses the consequences of refractoriness and adaptation. The voltage V(t) can be interpreted as the result of an integration of the differential equation of a leaky integrate-and-fire model coupled to  an arbitrary number of spike-triggered adaptation variables.

Spike firing is stochastic and happens with a time-dependent stochastic intensity (instantaneous rate)

 

 

Here  is the firing threshold of an inactive neuron and  describes the increase of the threshold after a spike at time . In case of a fixed threshold, one sets =0. For  the threshold process is deterministic.

The time course of the filters  that characterize the spike response model can be directly extracted from experimental data. With optimized parameters the SRM describes the time course of the subthreshold  membrane voltage for time-dependent input with a precision of 2mV and can predict the timing of most output spikes with a precision of 4ms. The SRM is closely related to linear-nonlinear-Poisson cascade models (also called Generalized Linear Model). The estimation of parameters of probabilistic neuron models such as the SRM using methods developed for Generalized Linear Models is discussed in Chapter 10 of the textbook Neuronal Dynamics.

The name spike response model arises because in a network, the input current for neuron i is  generated by the spikes of other neurons so that in the case of a network the voltage equation becomes

 

where  are the firing times  of neuron j (i.e., its spike train), and  describes the time course of the spike and the spike after-potential for neuron i,   and  describe the amplitude and time course of an excitatory  or inhibitory postsynaptic potential (PSP) caused by the spike  of the presynaptic neuron j. The time course  of the PSP results from the convolution of the  postsynaptic current  caused by the arrival of a presynaptic spike from neuron j with the membrane filter .

SRM0  
The  SRM0  is a stochastic neuron model related to time-dependent nonlinear renewal theory and a simplification of the Spike Renose Model (SRM). The main difference to the voltage equation of the SRM introduced above is that in the term containing the refractory kernel  there is no summation sign over past spikes: only the most recent spike (denoted as the time ) matters. Another difference is that the threshold is constant.  The model SRM0 can be formulated in discrete or continuous time. For example, in continuous time, the single-neuron equation is

 

and the network equations of the SRM0  are

 

where  is the last firing time neuron i. Note that the time course of the postsynaptic potential  is also allowed to depend on the time since the last spike of neuron i so as to describe a change in membrane conductance during refractoriness. The instantaneous firing rate (stochastic intensity) is

 

where  is a fixed firing threshold.  Thus spike firing of neuron i depends only on its input and the time since neuron i has fired its last spike.

With the SRM0, the interspike-interval distribution for constant input can be mathematically linked to the shape of the refractory kernel  .  Moreover the stationary frequency-current relation can be calculated from the escape rate in combination with the refractory kernel . With an appropriate choice of the kernels, the SRM0 approximates the dynamics of the Hodgkin-Huxley model to a high degree of accuracy. Moreover, the PSTH response to arbitrary time-dependent input can be predicted.

Galves–Löcherbach model 

The Galves–Löcherbach model is a stochastic neuron model closely related to the spike response model SRM0  and to the leaky integrate-and-fire model. It is inherently stochastic and, just like the SRM0 linked to time-dependent nonlinear renewal theory. Given the model specifications, the probability that a given neuron  spikes in a time period  may be described by

 

where  is a synaptic weight, describing the influence of neuron  on neuron ,  expresses the leak, and  provides the spiking history of neuron  before , according to

 

Importantly, the spike probability of  neuron i depends only on its spike input (filtered with a kernel    and weighted with a factor ) and the timing of its most recent output spike (summarized by ).

Didactic toy models of membrane voltage 
The models in this category are highly simplified toy models that qualitatively describe the membrane voltage as a function of input. They are mainly used for didactic reasons in teaching but are not considered valid neuron models for large-scale simulations or data fitting.

FitzHugh–Nagumo 

Sweeping simplifications to Hodgkin–Huxley were introduced by FitzHugh and Nagumo in 1961 and 1962. Seeking to describe "regenerative self-excitation" by a nonlinear positive-feedback membrane voltage and recovery by a linear negative-feedback gate voltage, they developed the model described by

where we again have a membrane-like voltage and input current with a slower general gate voltage  and experimentally-determined parameters . Although not clearly derivable from biology, the model allows for a simplified, immediately available dynamic, without being a trivial simplification. The experimental support is weak, but the model is useful as a didactic tool to introduce dynamics of spike generation through phase plane analysis. See Chapter 7 in the textbook Methods of Neuronal Modeling

Morris–Lecar 

In 1981 Morris and Lecar combined the Hodgkin–Huxley and FitzHugh–Nagumo models into a voltage-gated calcium channel model with a delayed-rectifier potassium channel, represented by

where . The experimental support  of the model is weak, but the model is useful as a didactic tool to introduce dynamics of spike generation through phase plane analysis. See Chapter 7 in the textbook Methods of Neuronal Modeling.

A two-dimensional neuron model very similar to the Morris-Lecar model can be derived step-by-step starting from the Hodgkin-Huxley model. See Chapter 4.2 in the textbook Neuronal Dynamics.

Hindmarsh–Rose 

Building upon the FitzHugh–Nagumo model, Hindmarsh and Rose proposed in 1984 a model of neuronal activity described by three coupled first-order differential equations:

This extra mathematical complexity allows a great variety of dynamic behaviors for the membrane potential, described by the  variable of the model, which include chaotic dynamics. This makes the Hindmarsh–Rose neuron model very useful, because being still simple, allows a good qualitative description of the many different firing patterns of the action potential, in particular bursting,  observed in experiments. Nevertheless, it remains a toy model and has not been fitted to experimental data. It is widely used as a reference model for bursting dynamics.

Theta model and quadratic integrate-and-fire. 

The theta model, or Ermentrout–Kopell canonical Type I model, is mathematically equivalent to the quadratic integrate-and-fire model which in turn is an approximation to the exponential integrate-and-fire model and the Hodgkin-Huxley model. It is called a canonical model because it is one of the generic models for constant input close to the bifurcation point, which means close to the transition from silent  to repetitive firing.

The standard formulation of the theta model is

 

The equation for the quadratic integrate-and-fire model is (see Chapter 5.3 in the textbook Neuronal Dynamics ))

 

The equivalence of theta model and quadratic integrate-and-fire is for example reviewed in Chapter 4.1.2.2  of spiking neuron models.

For input I(t)  that changes over time or is far away from the bifurcation point, it is preferable to work with the exponential integrate-and-fire model (if one wants the stay in the class of one-dimensional neuron models), because real neurons exhibit the nonlinearity of the exponential integrate-and-fire model.

Sensory input-stimulus encoding neuron models 

The models in this category were derived following experiments involving natural stimulation such as light, sound, touch, or odor. In these experiments, the spike pattern resulting from each stimulus presentation varies from trial to trial, but the averaged response from several trials often converges to a clear pattern. Consequently, the models in this category generate a probabilistic relationship between the input stimulus to spike occurrences. Importantly, the recorded neurons are often located several processing steps after the sensory neurons, so that these models summarize the effects of the sequence of processing steps in a compact form

The non-homogeneous Poisson process model (Siebert) 
Siebert modeled the neuron spike firing pattern using a non-homogeneous Poisson process model, following experiments involving the auditory system. According to Siebert, the probability of a spiking event at the time interval  is proportional to a non negative function , where  is the raw stimulus.:

 

The main advantage of Siebert's model is its simplicity. The shortcomings of the model is its inability to reflect properly the following phenomena:
 The transient enhancement of the neuronal firing activity in response to a step stimulus.
 The saturation of the firing rate.
 The values of inter-spike-interval-histogram at short intervals values (close to zero).
These shortcoming are addressed by the age-dependent point process model and the two-state Markov Model.

Refractoriness and age-dependent point process model 
Berry and Meister studied neuronal refractoriness using a stochastic model that predicts spikes as a product of two terms, a function f(s(t))  that depends on the time-dependent  stimulus s(t) and one a recovery function   that depends on the time since the last spike

 

The model is also called an inhomogeneous Markov interval (IMI) process.  Similar models have been used for many years in auditory neuroscience. Since the model keeps memory of the last spike time it is non-Poisson and falls in the class of time-dependent renewal models. It is closely related to the model  SRM0 with exponential escape rate. Importantly, it is possible to fit parameters of the age-dependent point process model so as to describe not just the PSTH response, but also the interspike-interval statistics.

Linear-nonlinear Poisson cascade model and GLM 

The linear-nonlinear-Poisson cascade model is a cascade of a linear filtering process followed by a nonlinear spike generation step. In the case that output spikes feed back, via a linear filtering process, we arrive at a model that is known in the neurosciences as Generalized Linear Model (GLM). The GLM is mathematically equivalent to the spike response model SRM) with  escape noise; but whereas in the SRM the internal variables are interpreted as the membrane potential and the firing threshold,  in the GLM the internal variables are abstract quantities that summarizes the net effect of input (and recent output spikes) before spikes are generated in the final step.

The two-state Markov model (Nossenson & Messer) 

The spiking neuron model by Nossenson & Messer produces the probability of the neuron to fire a spike as a function of either an external or pharmacological stimulus. The model consists of a cascade of a receptor layer model and a spiking neuron model, as shown in Fig 4. The connection between the external stimulus to the spiking probability is made in two steps: First, a receptor cell model translates the raw external stimulus to neurotransmitter concentration, then, a spiking neuron model connects between neurotransmitter concentration to the firing rate (spiking probability).  Thus, the spiking neuron model by itself depends on neurotransmitter concentration at the input stage.

An important feature of this model is the prediction for neurons firing rate pattern which captures, using a low number of free parameters, the characteristic edge emphasized response of neurons to a stimulus pulse, as shown in Fig. 5. The firing rate is identified both as a normalized probability for neural spike firing, and as a quantity proportional to the current of neurotransmitters released by the cell. The expression for the firing rate takes the following form:

 

where, 
 P0 is the probability of the neuron to be "armed" and ready to fire. It is given by the following differential equation:

 

P0 could be generally calculated recursively using Euler method, but in the case of a pulse of stimulus it yields a simple closed form expression.
 y(t) is the input of the model and is interpreted as the neurotransmitter concentration on the cell surrounding (in most cases glutamate). For an external stimulus it can be estimated through the receptor layer model:

 

with  being short temporal average of stimulus power (given in Watt or other energy per time unit).
 R0 corresponds to the intrinsic spontaneous firing rate of the neuron.
 R1 is the recovery rate of the neuron from the refractory state.

Other predictions by this model include:

1) The averaged evoked response potential (ERP) due to the population of many neurons in unfiltered measurements resembles the firing rate.

2) The voltage variance of activity due to multiple neuron activity resembles the firing rate (also known as Multi-Unit-Activity power or MUA).

3) The inter-spike-interval probability distribution takes the form a gamma-distribution like function.

Pharmacological input stimulus neuron models 
The models in this category produce predictions for experiments involving pharmacological stimulation.

Synaptic transmission (Koch & Segev)

According to the model by Koch and Segev, the response of a neuron to individual neurotransmitters can be modeled as an extension of the classical Hodgkin–Huxley model with both standard and nonstandard kinetic currents. Four neurotransmitters primarily have influence in the CNS. AMPA/kainate receptors are fast excitatory mediators while NMDA receptors mediate considerably slower currents. Fast inhibitory currents go through GABAA receptors, while GABAB receptors mediate by secondary G-protein-activated potassium channels. This range of mediation produces the following current dynamics:

For GABAB,  is the concentration of the G-protein, and  describes the dissociation of G in binding to the potassium gates.

The dynamics of this more complicated model have been well-studied experimentally and produce important results in terms of very quick synaptic potentiation and depression, that is, fast, short-term learning.

The stochastic model by Nossenson and Messer translates neurotransmitter concentration at the input stage to the probability of releasing neurotransmitter at the output stage. For a more detailed description of this model, see the Two state Markov model section above.

HTM neuron model 
The HTM neuron model was developed by Jeff Hawkins and researchers at Numenta and is based on a theory called Hierarchical Temporal Memory, originally described in the book On Intelligence. It is based on neuroscience and the physiology and interaction of pyramidal neurons in the neocortex of the human brain.

Applications 

Spiking Neuron Models are used in a variety of applications that need encoding into or decoding from neuronal spike trains in the context of neuroprosthesis and brain-computer interfaces such as retinal prosthesis: or artificial limb control and sensation. Applications are not part of this article; for more information on this topic please refer to the main article.

Relation between artificial and biological neuron models 
The most basic model of a neuron consists of an input with some synaptic weight vector and an activation function or transfer function inside the neuron determining output. This is the basic structure used for artificial neurons, which in a neural network often looks like

 

While this model has seen success in machine-learning applications, it is a poor model for real (biological) neurons, because it lacks time-dependence  in input and output.

When an input is switched on at a time t and kept constant thereafter, biological neurons emit a spike train. Importantly this spike train is not regular but exhibits a temporal structure characterized by adaptation, bursting, or initial bursting followed by regular spiking. Generalized integrate-and-fire model such as the Adaptive Exponential Integrate-and-Fire model, the spike response model, or the (linear) adaptive integrate-and-fire model are able to capture these neuronal firing patterns.

Moreover, neuronal input in the brain is time-dependent. Time-dependent input is transformed by complex linear and nonlinear filters into a spike train in the output. Again, the spike response model or the adaptive integrate-and-fire model enable to predict the spike train in the output for arbitrary time-dependent input, whereas an artificial neuron or a simple leaky integrate-and-fire does not.

If we take the Hodkgin-Huxley model as a starting point, generalized integrate-and-fire models can be derived systematically in a step-by-step simplification procedure. This has been shown explicitly for the exponential integrate-and-fire model and the spike response model.

In the case of modelling a biological neuron, physical analogues are used in place of abstractions such as "weight" and "transfer function". A neuron is filled and surrounded with water containing ions, which carry electric charge. The neuron is bound by an insulating cell membrane and can maintain a concentration of charged ions on either side that determines a capacitance . The firing of a neuron involves the movement of ions into the cell that occurs when neurotransmitters cause ion channels on the cell membrane to open. We describe this by a physical time-dependent current . With this comes a change in voltage, or the electrical potential energy difference between the cell and its surroundings, which is observed to sometimes result in a voltage spike called an action potential which travels the length of the cell and triggers the release of further neurotransmitters.

If the input current is constant, most neurons emit after some time of adaptation or initial bursting a regular spike train. The frequency of regular firing in response to a constant  current  is described by the frequency-current relation which corresponds to the transfer function  of artificial neural networks. Similarly, for all spiking neuron models the transfer function  can be calculated numerically (or analytically).

Cable theory and compartmental models 

All of the above deterministic models are point-neuron models because they do not consider the spatial structure of a neuron. However, the dendrite contributes to transforming input into output.  Point neuron models are valid description in three cases. (i) If input current is directly injected into the soma. (ii) If synaptic input arrives predominantly at or close to the soma (closeness is defined by a length scale  introduced below.  (iii) If synapse arrive anywhere on the dendrite, but the dendrite is completely linear. In the last case the cable acts as a linear filter; these linear filter properties can be included in the formulation of generalized integrate-and-fire models such as the spike response model.

The filter properties can be calculate from a cable equation.

Let us consider a cell membrane in the form a cylindrical cable. If everything is linear, the voltage changes as a function of timeWe introduce a length scale   on the left side and time constant   on the right side. The cable equation can now be written in its perhaps best known form: 
The above cable equation is valid for a single cylindrical cable.

Linear cable theory describes the dendritic arbor of a neuron as a cylindrical structure undergoing a regular pattern of bifurcation, like branches in a tree. For a single cylinder or an entire tree, the static input conductance at the base (where the tree meets the cell body, or any such boundary) is defined as

,

where  is the electrotonic length of the cylinder which depends on its length, diameter, and resistance. A simple recursive algorithm scales linearly with the number of branches and can be used to calculate the effective conductance of the tree. This is given by

where we can find the general correction factor  experimentally by noting .

The linear cable model makes a number of simplifications to give closed analytic results, namely that the dendritic arbor must branch in diminishing pairs in a fixed pattern and that dendrites are linear. A compartmental model allows for any desired tree topology with arbitrary branches and lengths, as well as arbitrary nonlinearities. It is essentially a discretized computational implementation of nonlinear dendrites.

Each individual piece, or compartment, of a dendrite is modeled by a straight cylinder of arbitrary length  and diameter  which connects with fixed resistance to any number of branching cylinders. We obtain a series of equations for conductance ratios in and out of a compartment by making corrections to the normal dynamic , as

Then our total neuron conductance for static input is given by

Importantly, static input is a very special case. In biology inputs are time dependent. Moreover, dendrites are not always linear.

Compartmental models enable to include nonlinearities via ion channels positioned at arbitrary locations along the dendrites. For static inputs, it is sometimes possible to reduce the number of compartments (increase the computational speed) and yet retain the salient electrical characteristics.

Conjectures regarding the role of the neuron in the wider context of the brain principle of operation

The neurotransmitter-based energy detection scheme 
The neurotransmitter-based energy detection scheme suggests that the neural tissue chemically executes a Radar-like detection procedure.

As shown in Fig. 6, the key idea of the conjecture is to account neurotransmitter concentration, neurotransmitter generation and neurotransmitter removal rates as the important quantities in executing the detection task, while referring to the measured electrical potentials as a side effect that only in certain conditions coincide with the functional purpose of each step.  The detection scheme is similar to a radar-like "energy detection" because it includes signal squaring, temporal summation and a threshold switch mechanism, just like the energy detector, but it also includes a unit that emphasizes stimulus edges and a variable memory length (variable memory). According to this conjecture, the physiological equivalent of the energy test statistics is neurotransmitter concentration, and the firing rate corresponds to neurotransmitter current. The advantage of this interpretation is that it leads to a unit consistent explanation which allows to bridge between electrophysiological measurements, biochemical measurements and psychophysical results.

The evidence reviewed in suggest the following association between functionality to histological classification:
 Stimulus squaring is likely to be performed by receptor cells.
 Stimulus edge emphasizing and signal transduction is performed by neurons.
 Temporal accumulation of neurotransmitters is performed by glial cells. Short term neurotransmitter accumulation is likely to occur also in some types of neurons.
 Logical switching is executed by glial cells, and it results from exceeding a threshold level of neurotransmitter concentration. This threshold crossing is also accompanied by a change in neurotransmitter leak rate.
 Physical all-or-non movement switching is due to muscle cells and results from exceeding a certain neurotransmitter concentration threshold on muscle surroundings.

Note that although the electrophysiological signals in Fig.6 are often similar to the functional signal (signal power / neurotransmitter concentration / muscle force), there are some stages in which the electrical observation is different from the functional purpose of the corresponding step. In particular, Nossenson et al. suggested that glia threshold crossing has a completely different functional operation compared to the radiated electrophysiological signal, and that the latter might only be a side effect of glia break.

General comments regarding the modern perspective of scientific and engineering models
 The models above are still idealizations. Corrections must be made for the increased membrane surface area given by numerous dendritic spines, temperatures significantly hotter than room-temperature experimental data, and nonuniformity in the cell's internal structure. Certain observed effects do not fit into some of these models. For instance, the temperature cycling (with minimal net temperature increase) of the cell membrane during action potential propagation not compatible with models which rely on modeling the membrane as a resistance which must dissipate energy when current flows through it. The transient thickening of the cell membrane during action potential propagation is also not predicted by these models, nor is the changing capacitance and voltage spike that results from this thickening incorporated into these models. The action of some anesthetics such as inert gases is problematic for these models as well. New models, such as the soliton model attempt to explain these phenomena, but are less developed than older models and have yet to be widely applied.
 Modern views regarding of the role of the scientific model suggest that "All models are wrong but some are useful" (Box and Draper, 1987, Gribbin, 2009; Paninski et al., 2009).
Recent conjecture suggests that each neuron might function as a collection of independent threshold units. It is suggested that a neuron could be anisotropically activated following the origin of its arriving signals to the membrane, via its dendritic trees. The spike waveform was also proposed to be dependent on the origin of the stimulus.

External links 

 Neuronal Dynamics: from single neurons to networks and models of cognition (W. Gerstner, W. Kistler, R. Naud, L. Paninski, Cambridge University Press, 2014).  In particular, Chapters 6 - 10, html online version.
 Spiking Neuron Models (W. Gerstner and W. Kistler, Cambridge University Press, 2002)

See also 
Binding neuron
Bayesian approaches to brain function
Brain-computer interfaces
Free energy principle
Models of neural computation
Neural coding
Neural oscillation
Quantitative models of the action potential
Spiking Neural Network

References 

Biophysics
Computational neuroscience
Neuroscience